Chanan Safir Colman (born March 10, 1984) is a Danish-Israeli professional basketball player for Hapoel Haifa of the  Israel Basketball Premier League. He played college basketball for Chipola before playing professionally in Finland, Israel, Denmark. Colman was named the Finnish League Finals MVP in 2006 and the Danish League MVP in 2012.

Personal life
Colman was born in Gladsaxe, Denmark to an Israeli mother and an American Jewish father.  He started playing basketball when he was 9 years old. During an interview in 2017, Chanan revealed that he speaks a total of three languages; Danish, English and Hebrew.

Since 2014, Colman has ran a basketball camp for children in Denmark aged 8-19, named Camp Colman, which hosts hundreds of children each year.

In 2021, Colman began dating British singer/songwriter Jessie J. On January 6th 2023, the couple announced they are expecting their first baby together later in the year

Professional career

Early years (2004–2010)
In 2004, Colman started his professional career with the Finnish team Lappeenrannan NMKY. In his first two seasons with Lappeenrannan, Colman won the Finnish League and the Finnish Cup for two consecutive years. He was also named the 2006 Finnish League Finals MVP.

On September 7, 2006, Colman signed with the Israeli team Ironi Ashkelon for the 2006–07 season. On November 19, 2006, Colman recorded a career-high 26 points, shooting 8-of-11 from the field in a 78–86 loss to Hapoel Jerusalem. On December 25, 2006, Colman received an Israeli passport.

On August 30, 2007, Colman signed a one-year deal with Hapoel Gilboa Afula.

Svendborg Rabbits (2010–2012)
On July 1, 2010, Colman signed a two-year deal with Danish team Svendborg Rabbits. On February 16, 2012, Colman tied his career-high 26 points, shooting 11-of-14 from the field, along with four rebounds and seven assists in a 109–94 win over Copenhagen Wolfpack. In his second season with Svendborg, Colman was named the Basketligaen MVP and led Svendborg to the 2012 Basketligaen Finals, where they eventually lost to Bakken Bears. In 40 games played for Svendborg, he averaged 15.6 points, 4.5 assists, 4 rebounds and 1.1 steals per game.

Maccabi Haifa (2012–2013)
On August 8, 2012, Colman signed with Maccabi Haifa for the 2012–2013 season. That season, Colman won the 2013 Israeli League Championship with Haifa.

Hapoel Jerusalem / Rishon LeZion (2013–14)
On July 31, 2013, Colman signed with Hapoel Jerusalem for the 2013–2014 season. However, on February 19, 2014, Colman parted ways with Jerusalem and signed with Maccabi Rishon LeZion for the rest of the season.

Randers Cimbria (2014)
On July 4, 2014, Colman signed with the Danish team Randers Cimbria. However, On December 5, 2014, he parted ways with the team after appearing in nine games.

Return to Maccabi Haifa (2014–2016)

On December 5, 2014, Colman signed a one-year deal with Maccabi Haifa. On March 3, 2015, Colman participated in the 2015 Israeli League All-Star Game and the Three-Point Shootout during the same event.

On June 3, 2015, Colman signed a two-year contract extension with Maccabi Haifa. That season, Colman was named Maccabi Haifa's team captain. In 35 games played during the 2015–16 season, he averaged 9.6 points, 2.8 rebounds, 2.5 assists and 1.6 steals.

Hapoel Eilat (2016–2017)
On July 21, 2016, Colman signed with Hapoel Eilat for the 2016–2017 season. Colman helped Eilat reach the 2017 Israeli League Playoffs as the second seed, but they eventually were eliminated by his former team Maccabi Rishon LeZion.

Hapoel Holon (2017–2018)
On July 15, 2017, Colman signed with Hapoel Holon for the 2017–2018 season. Colman won the 2018 Israeli State Cup with Holon, as well as reaching the 2018 Israeli League Final, where they eventually lost to Maccabi Tel Aviv.

Hapoel Be'er Sheva (2018–2019)
On July 30, 2018, Colman a one-year deal signed with Hapoel Be'er Sheva, joining his former head coach Rami Hadar. On January 2, 2019, Colman recorded a double-double with a season-high 20 points and 11 rebounds, shooting 6-of-7 from three-point range, along with two assists and three steals in an 82–68 win over Hapoel Gilboa Galil. Colman helped Be'er Sheva reach the 2019 Israeli League Playoffs, where they eventually were eliminated by Hapoel Jerusalem in the Quarterfinals.

BMS Herlev Wolfpack (2019–2021)
On September 13, 2019, Colman returned to Denmark to sign with the Copenhagen Wolfpack of the Danish Basketligaen.

Hapeol Haifa (2021–present)
On March 12, 2021, he has signed with Hapoel Haifa of the  Israel Basketball Premier League.

Denmark national team
Colman is a member of the Denmark national team. He participated in the 2005 and 2007 EuroBasket qualification tournaments.

References

External links
 RealGM profile
 FIBA profile

1984 births
Living people
Chipola Indians men's basketball players
Danish Jews
Danish men's basketball players
Danish people of American descent
Danish people of Israeli descent
Danish expatriate basketball people
Hapoel Be'er Sheva B.C. players
Hapoel Eilat basketball players
Hapoel Gilboa Galil Elyon players
Hapoel Holon players
Hapoel Jerusalem B.C. players
Ironi Ashkelon players
Israeli men's basketball players
Jewish men's basketball players
Maccabi Haifa B.C. players
Maccabi Rishon LeZion basketball players
People from Gladsaxe Municipality
Point guards
Shooting guards
Svendborg Rabbits players
Sportspeople from the Capital Region of Denmark